The men's team competition of the table tennis events at the 2011 Pan American Games will be held between October 15 and 17 at the CODE Dome  in Guadalajara, Mexico. The defending Pan American Games champion is team Brazil (Hugo Hoyama, Thiago Monteiro and Gustavo Tsuboi).

Round robin
The round robin will be used as a qualification round. The twelve teams will be split into groups of four. The top two teams from each group will advance to the first round of playoffs.

Group A

Group B

Group C

Group D

Playoffs

Quarterfinals

Semifinals

Final

References

Table tennis at the 2011 Pan American Games